Dynamite (Swedish: Dynamit) is a 1947 Swedish crime drama film directed by Åke Ohberg and starring Birgit Tengroth, Bengt Ekerot and Marianne Löfgren. It was shot at the Centrumateljéerna Studios in Stockholm. The film's sets were designed by the art director Nils Nilsson.

Synopsis
A young tearaway is drifting into a life of petty crime. He steals some dynamite in order to frighten people. However, one of his teachers believes that there is still hope for him.

Cast
 Birgit Tengroth as Gudrun Brogren
 Åke Ohberg as 	Sixten Krogh
 Bengt Ekerot as 	Allan Axelson
 Marianne Löfgren as 	Ottilia Axelsson
 Carl Ström as 	Axelsson
 Nils Hallberg as 	Oskar Axelsson
 Hilda Borgström as Mrs. Plym
 Erik Berglund as 	Criminal Inspector 
 Märta Arbin as 	Criminal Inspector's wife
 Ingemar Pallin as 	Criminal Inspector's son
 Gull Natorp as 	Dean's Wife
 Carin Swensson as 	Dean's housemaid
 Harry Ahlin as Bodin
 Sif Ruud as 	Mrs. Bodin
 Rudolf Wendbladh as Principal
 Olav Riégo as 	Colonel
 Maja Cassel as 	Colonel's wife
 Gustav Hedberg as 	Constable Svärd 
 Gösta Ericsson as 	Constable Carlsson
 Åke Engfeldt as Lt. Erik Arnell
 Sten Lindgren as 	Larsson, grocery store owner 
 Magnus Kesster as Complaining man
 Mona Geijer-Falkner as 	Woman in milk store 
 Astrid Bodin as 	Woman in milk store
 Elsa Ebbesen as Woman

References

Bibliography 
 Larsson, Mariah & Marklund, Anders (ed.). Swedish Film: An Introduction and Reader. Nordic Academic Press, 2010.
 Qvist, Per Olov & von Bagh, Peter. Guide to the Cinema of Sweden and Finland. Greenwood Publishing Group, 2000.

External links 
 

1947 films
Swedish crime films
1947 crime films
1940s Swedish-language films
Films directed by Åke Ohberg
Films based on Swedish novels
1940s Swedish films